The H & R Ultraslug Hunter is a rifled, single shot deer shotgun made by H & R Firearms. It is accurate with saboted slugs up to 200 yards. It comes in 12 and 20 gauges and has a factory mounted scope base.

This gun costs approximately US$250. Saboted slugs cost about US$15 for 5 shells.

The Ultra slug barrel is a "Heavy" barrel. It is about 1/8" thick all the way around and the added weight helps tremendously with recoil. There is also a bar in the stock that helps with recoil. It is extremely accurate with the aforementioned sabot slugs due to the extremely high velocity and aerodynamic stability of the slugs.

Single-shot shotguns of the United States